Glasgow Underground Recordings is a house music record label owned by Scottish electronic musician Kevin McKay.

The label was created in 1997 and has been home to artists such as Romanthony, DJ Q, Mateo & Matos, Pascal Rioux, Rose Smith, Muzique Tropique, Milton Jackson and DJ Mash. In 2006, McKay set up Prestel Records, which released a number of 12" records, notably by Das Pop, Cobra Dukes and Dada Life.

In 2011 he resurrected the label to release a number of compilations and singles.

See also
 List of record labels

References

External links
 Website

British record labels
Record labels established in 1997
Electronic dance music record labels
Electronic music record labels